Mezre in Iran may refer to:
 Mezre, East Azerbaijan
 Mezre, Qazvin